Purple Ribbon Records is a record label owned by Outkast and distributed through Virgin Records. It is run solely by Big Boi. It is credited with launching the career of Janelle Monáe.

Discography
As Aquemini Records:

 Slimm Calhoun – The Skinny (2001)
 Killer Mike – Monster (2003)
 Various – Aquemini Records - Volume 1 (2003)

As Purple Ribbon Records:
Big Boi – Got That Purp (2005)
Big Boi Presents Purple Ribbon All Stars – Got Purp? Vol 2 (2005)
Bubba Sparxx –The Charm (2006)
Sleepy Brown – Mr. Brown (2006)
Janelle Monáe – Metropolis: Suite I (The Chase) (2007) — joint release with Bad Boy Records
Vonnegutt – Falling Up the Stairs (2012)
Big Boi & Sleepy Brown - Big Sleepover (2021)

See also
 List of record labels

References

American record labels
Vanity record labels
Hip hop record labels
Dungeon Family